Baron Lars Herman Gyllenhaal (1790–1858) was a Swedish civil servant, politician, Baron and a Lord of the Realm.

Early life 
Born into the Swedish noble Gyllenhaal family, as the fourth child and only son of Lorentz Herman Gyllenhaal (1757–1830) and his wife, Baroness Hedvig Margareta Leuhusen (1763-1857), daughter of Baron Carl Leuhausen (1724-1795) and Juliana Margareta Nordencrantz (1743-1769).

Career 
Gyllenhaal was "president," in the Göta Court of Appeals 1836–1855, Prime Minister for Justice 1843–1844. Again chief justice in the Göta court of appeal from 28 December 1844 to 3 April 1855. Speaker (lantmarskalk) in the Estate of the Nobility in the Riksdag 1850–1851.  HedLLA 43 (Honorary Member of the Agriculture Academy 1843) RoKKMO 51 (Knight and Commander of the Orders of His Majesty the King 1851).

Personal life 
He married firstly Henrika Lovisa Ulrika Tham (1791-1816), daughter of Casper Tham (1750-1805) and his wife, Baroness Elisabeth Albertina Margareta von Knorring (1765-1802), both of descending from German nobility. After the death of his first wife, he married secondly Elisabet Sofia Palm (1795-1865), daughter of Jakob Svensson Palm (1748-1821) and Margareta Christina Lidman (1758-1815). He had issue from both marriages.

See also
Gyllenhaal family

References
Biography in Nordisk familjebok, 2nd ed., Vol. 10 (1909) (on Projekt Runeberg)
Biography in Svenskt biografiskt handlexikon, vol. 1 (1906).

External links
Gyllenhaal family website

1790 births
1858 deaths
19th-century Swedish politicians
Swedish Ministers for Justice
Lars Herman
Knights of the Order of Charles XIII